E.G.F. (Entreprise Générale de Franceville) is a Gabonese company specialized in Civil Engineering, construction and special works in hard places.

History of E.G.F. 
EGF was founded in Franceville (Gabon) by Benoist SENET in 2000. The company started in a bad economical period due to the area seeing a decline in investments and big projects. Businesses refocused on Gabon's coast, especially in Port Gentil and Libreville, and EGF naturally moved to Libreville.

From then, the company developed quickly because it worked with two dynamic branches of industry: telecom and energy.

The growth of oil's cost in the second part of the 2000s triggered oil companies to reinvest in old oil fields. Maurel et Prom, a French junior oil company, which developed in Gabon began to work with E.G.F.

E.G.F.'s Services and Activities 

E.G.F.'s areas of focus are civil engineering, construction and special works. E.G.F. designs and builds structures like helipads, camps, warehouses, landing stages, schools, gas pipe gutters, wellhead's cellars, etc.

Notes and references

Civil engineering organizations